Group A was one of four groups of nations competing at the 2011 AFC Asian Cup. The group's first matches began on 7 January 2011 and its last matches were played on 16 January 2011. All six group matches were played at venues in Doha, Qatar. The group consisted of hosts Qatar, China PR, Kuwait and Uzbekistan.

Standings

All times are UTC+3.

Qatar vs Uzbekistan

Kuwait vs China PR

Uzbekistan vs Kuwait

China PR vs Qatar

Qatar vs Kuwait

China PR vs Uzbekistan

Notes

External links
 2011 AFC Asian Cup Official Site

Group
2010–11 in Qatari football
2010–11 in Kuwaiti football
2011 in Chinese football
2011 in Uzbekistani football